National Geographic Wild (shortened as Nat Geo Wild and abbreviated NGW) is a global pay television network owned by National Geographic Partners, a joint venture between The Walt Disney Company (73%) and the National Geographic Society (27%). The channel primarily focuses on wildlife and natural history non-fiction programming. It is a sister network to National Geographic TV.

The channel first launched in Hong Kong on 1 January 2006. It later launched in the United Kingdom, Turkey, Ireland, Romania, India, Vietnam, and Poland replacing the now defunct Adventure One. The channel remains the world's first bilingual wildlife service, available in English and Cantonese in the Hong Kong market as well as Tagalog in The Philippines. It launched in Latin America on 1 November 2009 as a high definition channel. In 2010, it launched in the United States.

As of February 2015, approximately 57,891,000 American households (49.7% of households with television) receive Nat Geo Wild.

Programming

Availability

Africa
The channel launched in South Africa in mid-2009, and is available on the South African Satellite Network DStv.

It was launched on Zuku TV on Channel 416.

National Geographic Wild launched on Azam TV along with National Geographic.

In July 2021, National Geographic Wild was replaced by Animal Planet on Zuku TV and given to Channel 420.

Southeast Asia
In Singapore, the channel is carried on the StarHub TV subscription services. Astro and Unifi TV carried the channel in Malaysia with four language audio tracks included. Some shows on Nat Geo Wild are aired in Filipino (Tagalog) in the Philippines, which also have multiple languages available. Selected shows also aired on Fox Filipino (now defunct).

East Asia
In Hong Kong, the channel is carried on the Now TV subscription services. The channel launched in South Korea on 16 April 2009.

In Japan, the channel launched on January 10, 2011 and its carried on the Sky PerfecTV! subscription services. The Japanese version of the channel was closed on January 31, 2021.

Middle East and North Africa
OSN and beIN carries the channel for Middle East and North African  viewers. The channel launched in Israel on 23 July 2008.

Australia
The Asian version of the channel launched in Australia on 15 November 2009 on Austar and Foxtel.

A high definition feed launched on Foxtel on 1 November 2010. Although the HD feed was expected to launch on Austar in late 2010/early 2011, the channel did not launch until 1 July 2012, after Foxtel acquired Austar.

On 1 February 2015, Nat Geo Wild launched on Australian IPTV service Fetch TV.

Nat Geo Wild, alongside National Geographic, will officially cease broadcasting in Australia and New Zealand on 1 April 2023.

Canada

The Canadian version of Nat Geo Wild launched on 7 May 2012. Similar to National Geographic Channel, this channel is controlled by Corus Entertainment.

India
The channel launched in India on 31 July 2009. In 2013, a Hindi audiotrack of was launched on the channel. It features 4 audio track, which are in English, Telugu, Hindi and Tamil languages.

Europe

Pan-European feed

The channel launched on 1 March 2007 in Europe, and now reaches up to 10.5 million homes in the UK.

France
A French Nat Geo Wild was launched on 9 September 2008. Its HD feed launched on 8 November 2011. It is available in France, Belgium, Luxembourg, Switzerland, Africa and many other islands.

In France, it was exclusive of Canalsat and Numericable. In 2014, it joined ISP offers, but in 2018 it became a Canal+ exclusive again.

Italy
On 14 October 2007, an Italian Nat Geo Wild was launched on Sky Italia. It is also available in Switzerland. Its HD feed was launched on 1 February 2012 and a 1-hour timeshift feed on 28 September 2014. The channel shut down on October 1, 2022, alongside the National Geographic channel in Italy.

Spain
A Spanish Nat Geo Wild was launched on 1 October 2011.

Americas
The channel was launched in the United States on 29 March 2010, replacing Fox Reality Channel. Providers which carried the channel at the time of its launch included Time Warner Cable, Comcast, Cox Communications, Verizon Fios and AT&T U-verse. Dish Network did not reach a carriage agreement at launch, but began to broadcast the channel on 19 April 2010. DirecTV didn't carry the channel at the time of its launch either, but it added the channel to its lineup on 30 June. DirecTV added the HD feed on 15 August 2012. 

The Latin American version of the channel was launched on November 1, 2009 and ended operations on March 31, 2022, with its content moving to NatGeo, Disney+ and Star+.

See also 
 National Geographic TV
 National Geographic Society
 Nat Geo People
 List of programs broadcast by Nat Geo Wild

References

External links
 Nat Geo Wild - United States
 Nat Geo Wild - Australia
 Nat Geo Wild - Germany
 Nat Geo Wild - Poland
 Nat Geo Wild - Romania
 Net Geo Wild - Middle East & North Africa

Disney television networks
Television channels in the United Kingdom
Television networks in the United States
Television channels and stations established in 2006
English-language television stations in Australia
Wild
Fox Networks Group
Cable television in Hong Kong